Events from the year 1765 in Canada.

Incumbents
Monarch: George III

Governors
Governor of the Province of Quebec: James Murray
Governor of Nova Scotia: Montague Wilmot
Commodore-Governor of Newfoundland: Hugh Palliser

Events
 18 May – Fire destroys one quarter of the town of Montreal, Quebec.
 The Stamp Act increases discontent. A Stamp Act Congress meets in New York City to protest the Act.
 Reserve system in Canada begins with the provision of a tract of land for the Maliseet tribe.

Births

Deaths
 July 4 – Claude-Godefroy Coquart, missionary (born 1706)

Historical documents
Huge territories won in Seven Years War will ruin Britain with depopulation and trade rivalry (Note: "savages" used)

Thomas Pownall says good policy means faithful and just alliance with Indigenous people, and dropping "that idle, useless claim of dominion" over them

Long list of First Nations (from Atlantic to Mississippi) by name and "the Numbers of their fighting men"

Indigenous parents seldom chastise children because they are either too young to understand or too old to be dominated

"Revered among them in many transactions" - Nature and use of wampum, calumet and tomahawk by Indigenous people

Despite its northern location, Quebec is "a healthy, fruitful, and pleasant country," with St. Lawrence River providing "an extended sea-coast"

Gov. James Murray describes difficulty ruling Quebec given hostility among military, magistrates and merchants in Montreal

London merchants trading to Quebec petition Board of Trade on harmful effects of soldier violence and Gov. Murray's ordinances (Note: poor copy)

Notice of available land grants includes description of Quebec's fertility and productivity, and even its beneficial frost and snow

With end of hostilities with those "who lately appeared in Arms," any subject may take out Indigenous trade licence under Royal Proclamation

VIPs from England touring British colonies benefit from meeting Indigenous people, who demonstrate sagacity and intelligence (Note: "savage" used)

"Maricitte Indians [are] reduced to the lowest Ebb of Misery" by Canadians taking beaver on their Temiscouata-Madawaska-Rivière du Loup lands

Quebec governor's gardener solicits all with knowledge of botanicals, including those used in Indigenous medicines, paints and dyes

Chaplain of Quebec recommends inoculation as "happiest Preservative" against smallpox, it being safe, effective, and "approv'd at Rome"

School is opening to give instruction in "Arithmetic vulgar and decimal, the Extraction and Use of the Square and cube Roots, Mensuration" etc.

Montreal fire of May 18 destroys one-fourth (one-third by value) of city of 7,000, leaving 215 families homeless

"Fair to the eye [and] grateful to the taste" - Profile of Nova Scotia includes description of cod processing

With "water sufficient for any ship that swims," Halifax harbour has Royal Navy's chief American facility for careening and other maintenance

Protestant missionaries in Nova Scotia speak English, French, Mi'kmaw and German (Note: "savages" used)

Servants who desert their employers are liable to work twice length of their absence, unless they can prove they were abused

Nova Scotian describes Stamp Act unrest in Boston and calm in Halifax

French presence on St. Pierre and Miquelon draws Acadians and Mi'kmaq and warships to undermine British fishery and take Newfoundland

Ship-based fishery, source of seamen for wartime, "is now wholly dropt and excluded by Encroachers and Monopolizers" in Newfoundland

"If the English would be more honest, we should be more generous" - Haudenosaunee tell William Johnson they are cheated of their lands

Traveller says Pontiac and other Indigenous leaders love French for their kind and generous ways, and British will need long time to gain such respect

"[Almost] no part of North America[...]better worth settling, improving, and defending" - Great future foreseen for Great Lakes lands

Recommendation that half-dozen Great Lakes forts, especially ones at Detroit and on Niagara River, be for protecting and wintering British traders

Alexander Henry buys £1,250 in goods at Michilimackinac on 12 months credit and loads them into 4 canoes for exclusive trade on Lake Superior

Frederick Haldimand to move to Canada all St. John's Island Acadians, who will be allowed to take cattle and one firelock, powder and shot per family

"Advantages[...]would be derived from laying open this trade" - Reasons to end Hudson's Bay Company's monopoly

Scottish Jacobite writer has ghosts of Wolfe and Montcalm discuss their final, fatal and flawed campaigns in Seven Years War

Benjamin Franklin has some anonymous newspaper fun, relating Canadians' preparations for whaling and cod fishing in upper Great Lakes

References

 
Canada
65